La Barra Mendocina is a 1935  Argentine comedy film directed and written by Mario Soffici. The film premiered on August 2, 1935 in Buenos Aires.

Main cast
Alberto Anchart   
Alberto Bello   
Antonio Ber Ciani   
Dringue Farías   
José Gola   
Pilar Gómez   
Anita Jordán   
Lalo Malcolm   
Elsa O'Connor   
Alita Román   
Marcelo Ruggero   
Juan Sarcione   
Marino Seré   
Oscar Villa

External links

 

1935 films
1930s Spanish-language films
Argentine black-and-white films
1935 comedy films
Films directed by Mario Soffici
Argentine comedy films
1930s Argentine films